The Lima River (Portuguese name; known as Limia in Spanish and Galician) runs west from the autonomous community of Galicia in Spain to Portugal, where it enters the Atlantic Ocean at Viana do Castelo, covering .

Etymology and history
The Romans identified the Lima (called Limaeas) with the mythical Lethe and also said that some Celtiberians called it the Belion. Brutus Callaicus became the first Roman to cross the river, carrying his standard with him to convince his frightened soldiers to follow.

Description

It crosses the border into Portugal through the reservoir created by the Alto Lindoso Dam close to Lindoso village, just west of the border between the two countries. The dam includes a hydro-electric plant, and creates a large reservoir on the Spanish side of the border. The reservoir flooded several villages in the Spanish municipality of Lobios, including Aceredo and Buscalque, O Bao, A Reloeira and Lantemil, in 1992, but after a prolonged drought over the Spanish winter of 2021/2022, the "ghost village" of Aceredo had emerged and was again on dry land by February 2022.

The river runs through the municipalities of Ponte da Barca and Ponte de Lima, before reaching the Atlantic Ocean at Viana do Castelo.

See also
 Rivers of Galicia

References

 
Natura 2000 in Portugal